Capping Week is a term used in New Zealand for the week of graduation from university. This is when graduands of the university are presented with their degrees and capped.

Higher education in New Zealand